GN Bank is an indigenous private Ghanaian owned commercial bank in Ghana. GN Bank is one of the private commercial banks licensed to operate in Ghana. GN Bank has over 260 locations across the 10 regions of Ghana.

Services
GN Bank offers mainstream banking services which include cash deposits and withdrawals, savings and loans and financial advice consultation (private banking, corporate banking, consumer banking, corporate products, lending products, special services, money transfer). In 2014, GN Bank introduced a cash deposit service known as E-Banking. The service allows GN Bank customers to deposit cash into their bank accounts at their convenience through their smartphones (mobile phones) via First SMS Alert banking (First Net Banking) and M-POS (Mobile Point Of Sales)
Electronic Statement without physically being present in any bank branches of the GN Bank.

Board of directors
 Papa Kwesi Nduom is Chairman; Mr Issah Adams is Managing Director.

Branches

GN Bank is headquartered in Accra. GN Bank as at June 2016 has Two -hundred-and-sixty (260) operational branches in all the ten regions of Ghana territorial entities: Ashanti (23 operational branches); Brong-Ahafo (44 operational branches); Central (31 operational branches); Eastern (30 operational branches); Greater Accra (38 operational branches); Volta (18 operational branches); Northern (29 operational branches); Upper East (18 operational branches); Upper West (14 operational branches) and Western (27 operational branches).

Sponsorships

On 30 December 2014, GN Bank became the headline sponsor of the GN Bank Division One League. This sponsorship agreement between the GN Bank and the GFA is a three-year deal worth 1.2 million cedis to 2017.

Awards
In October, 2015 GN Bank wins Fastest growing Bank in Ghana at the 2015 Association of Ghana Industries Awards.

See also
 Capital Bank
 UniBank
 The Royal Bank

References

Banks of Ghana
Banks established in 1997
Companies based in Accra
Ghanaian companies established in 1997